Live at Sweet Basil is a live album by saxophonist Steve Lacy's Sextet, which was recorded in New York in 1991 and first released on the RCA Novus label in 1992.

Reception

The Allmusic review by Scott Yanow stated "This live set is an excellent example of the group's unique music performed live. The versions of Lacy's five scalar originals are each at least ten minutes long and find the musicians playing with enthusiasm and consistent creativity. Their relaxed but adventurous solo and ensemble work make this a set worth several listens".

Track listing
All compositions by Steve Lacy with lyrics as noted
 "Prospectus" (words by Blaise Cendrars) – 10:48
 "The Bath" – 12:38
 "Morning Joy" (words by Bob Kaufman) – 16:11
 "The Wane" – 14:55
 "Blinks" – 14:29

Personnel
Steve Lacy – soprano saxophone
Steve Potts – alto saxophone, soprano saxophone
Bobby Few – piano 
Irene Aebi – violin, voice
Jean-Jacques Avenel – bass 
John Betsch – drums

References

Steve Lacy (saxophonist) live albums
1992 live albums
Novus Records live albums